Ties of Love is an album by the pianist Buddy Montgomery, released by Landmark in 1987. The album, which was Montgomery's first in a decade, was recorded partly in New York with longtime producer Orrin Keepnews.

Reception

Scott Yanow of AllMusic noted: "By 1986, Buddy Montgomery had not recorded as a leader for many years, and because he is so well-respected, his first Landmark outing became quite an all-star affair. ... Despite all of the guests, the leader (who contributed five of the eight songs) does not get buried in the proceedings and holds his own with his friends." Fanfare singled out Claudio Roditi for praise, and called the album "a breezy session with some good, consistent music." Mark Stryker of Jazz Times commented: "Strong material, an infectious spirit, and bicoastal bands."

Track listing

Personnel
 Buddy Montgomery – piano, vibraphone, synthesized percussion
 Claudio Roditi – trumpet
 David "Fathead" Newman – tenor saxophone, flute
 Eddie Harris – tenor saxophone
 Ted Dunbar – guitar
 Ron Carter – double bass
 John Heard – double bass
 Marvin "Smitty" Smith – drums
 Billy Higgins – drums
 Warren Smith – percussion
 Steve Kroon – congas
 Marlena Shaw – vocals

References

Landmark Records albums
Buddy Montgomery albums
1987 albums
Albums produced by Orrin Keepnews
Albums recorded at Van Gelder Studio